The 1918 Grand National was cancelled because Aintree Racecourse was taken over by the War Office. However, a substitute race known as the War Steeplechase was held at Gatwick Racecourse. The Gatwick races held from 1916 to 1918 are typically omitted from the true Grand National records.

The race was won by Poethlyn, ridden by jockey Ernest Piggott and trained by Harry Escott.

Finishing Order

Non-finishers

References

http://www.grand-national.net/gatwick.htm

 1918
Grand National
Grand National
20th century in Sussex